Pyracantha coccinea, the scarlet firethorn is the European species of firethorn or red firethorn that has been cultivated in gardens since the late 16th century. The tree has small white flowers. It produces small, bright red berries. Its leaves are slightly toothed and grow opposite to one another. The fruit is bitter and astringent, making it inedible when raw. The fruit can be cooked to make jellies, jams, sauces and marmalade. It ranges from southern Europe to western Asia. It has been introduced to North America and cultivated there as an ornamental plant since the 18th century. 

In England, since the late 18th century, it has been used to cover unsightly walls.

Cultivars 

 Pyracantha coccinea 'Kasan'.
 Pyracantha coccinea 'Lalandei'. About 1874, M. Lalande, a nurseryman in Angers, France, selected from seedlings of P. coccinea an improved form, more freely berrying than the type. A sport has produced a yellow-berried form. These, and further selections, have largely ousted the ordinary form from nursery stock.
 Pyracantha coccinea 'Sparkler'.

References and external links

 info from Floridadata.com
 

coccinea